Baybulatovo (Baybulat) is a rural locality (a selo) in Chekmagushevsky District, Bashkortostan, Russia. The population was 205 as of 2010. There are 4 streets.

Geography 
Baybulatovo is located 23 km southwest of Chekmagush (the district's administrative centre) by road. Rezyapovo is the nearest rural locality.

References 

Rural localities in Chekmagushevsky District